A balloon debate is a debate in which a number of speakers attempt to win the approval of an audience. The audience is invited to imagine that the speakers are flying in a hot-air balloon which is sinking and that someone must be thrown out if everyone is not to die.

Each speaker has to make the case why they should not be thrown out of the balloon to save the remainder. Typically each participant speaks on behalf of a famous person, profession, fictional character, etc. Other perilous situations may take the place of the sinking balloon, for example, a shipwrecked raft, or a nuclear bunker. 

The balloon debate style appears in the Big Brother reality television series where contestants must make a case for them not being thrown out.

It is often used to build argumentative skills in preparation for Speech and Debate activities such as public forum, policy debate and Lincoln-Douglas.

See also 
Lifeboat ethics
Storytelling game

References

Debating